Tin Star is a British television crime drama created by Rowan Joffé. The series focuses on Jim Worth, a former London Metropolitan Police Service detective who becomes chief of police of a Canadian town in the Rocky Mountains. It stars Tim Roth, Genevieve O'Reilly, Abigail Lawrie, Oliver Coopersmith and Christina Hendricks.

The series premiered on Sky Atlantic on 7 September 2017, and became available on Amazon Video internationally on 29 September. Series 2 premiered 24 January 2019. The third and final series takes place in Liverpool, England. Production for the series commenced in 2019, with all episodes airing in December 2020.

Synopsis
Former London undercover police detective Jim Worth is the seemingly gentle police chief of Little Big Bear, a small town at the edge of the Canadian Rockies, where his family of four has moved to escape his violent past. But, thanks to a chief of security for North Stream Oil, the oil company that dominates the town, Worth's past catches up with him and he and his wife Angela call into service Jim's violent, alcoholic alter-ego, Jack Devlin, to fight anyone they suspect of hurting their family. The local head of public relations for North Stream, Elizabeth Bradshaw, wavers between ethics and criminality against a backdrop of rough oil workers and bikers.

Cast and characters
Tim Roth as James "Jim" Worth, a former Metropolitan Police detective and the new Chief of Little Big Bear Police, and as Jack Devlin, Worth's violent alter-ego, which he slips into when under the influence of alcohol.
Christina Hendricks as Elizabeth Bradshaw (series 1–2), Vice President of Stakeholder Relations for North Stream Oil. Bradshaw has the job of trying to maintain a peaceful working relationship with North Stream and the local populace. This is made difficult by her dispute with Chief Worth. She often finds herself on morally ambiguous ground.
Genevieve O'Reilly as Angela Worth, Jim's wife.
Abigail Lawrie as Anna Worth, Angela's daughter.
Oliver Coopersmith as Simon "Whitey" Brown (series 1—2), Frank's nephew with a past connection to Worth.
Ian Puleston-Davies as Frank Keane, a criminal figure from Jim's past; uncle of Whitey.
Sarah Podemski as Constable, later Chief Denise Minahik, a First Nations officer with Little Big Bear Police, and second-in-command to Chief Worth. Also in a somewhat secret relationship with Constable McGillen. Her estranged father is a Chief in the local First Nations tribe.
Ryan Kennedy as Constable Nick McGillen, a junior officer with Little Big Bear Police, in a somewhat secret relationship with Constable Minahik.
Lynda Boyd as Randy, the owner of Randy's Roadhouse, a bar and later strip club; partner of Frank Keane.
Michelle Thrush as Jaclyn Letendre (series 1–2), a member of the Ipowahtaman tribe who relocates to the Musqwa reserve.
John Lynch as Pastor Johan Nickel (series 2), a Mexican Canadian Ammonite preacher.
Anamaria Marinca as Sarah Nickel (series 2), the community dentist and wife of Pastor Johan.
Jenessa Grant as Rosa Nickel (series 2), daughter of Pastor Johan.
Nigel Bennett as Friedrich Quiring (series 2), leader of the Ammonite community.
Christopher Heyerdahl as Louis Gagnon (series 1), North Stream Oil's enigmatic head of security.
Stephen Walters as Johnny (series 1), a career criminal from Blackpool, England working closely with Frank.
Rupert Turnbull as Peter Worth (series 1), Jim and Angela's five-year-old son, who is shot dead in a botched assassination attempt.
Ray G. Thunderchild as Jacob Minahik (series 1), chief of the Musqwa tribe and Denise's estranged father.
Roark Critchlow as Detective Inspector Benoit Lehane (series 1), Royal Canadian Federal Police.
Kevin Hanchard as Father Gregoire (series 1), Jim's Alcoholics Anonymous sponsor. 
Tobi Bamtefa as Reginald Godswill (series 1), a criminal enforcer working with Whitey, Frank and Johnny.
Jack Veal as Young Simon (series 1), seen in flashbacks to 2007.
Gerald Auger as Timothy Whiteknife (series 1), a member of the Musqwa First Nations.
Joseph Whitebird as Ray Laskamin (series 1), a member of the Musqwa First Nations.
Owen Crowshoe as Hal Laskamin (series 1), a member of the Musqwa First Nations.
Lorne Cardinal as Chief Lightfoot (series 1), head of the Reverie Ipowahtaman Tribal Police. 
Nicholas Campbell as Wallace Lyle (series 1)
Maxwell McCabe-Lokos as Daniel Lyle (series 1)
Rachael Crawford as Dr. Susan Bouchard (series 1)
Tanya Moodie as Catherine Mckenzie (series 3)

Episodes

Series 1 (2017)
Aired weekly on Sky Atlantic; the entire series was also available to download via Sky Box Sets and Now TV on 7 September 2017.

Series 2 (2019)
Aired weekly on Sky Atlantic; the entire series was also available to download via Sky Box Sets and Now TV on 24 January 2019. Amazon Prime released the whole season two in the US on 7 March 2019 but they have yet to reveal a date for release in the UK. A DVD & Blu-Ray release is due on 15 April 2019 and is currently available to pre-order. Amazon's episode guide lists an extra episode in addition to the original 9 episodes released by Sky Atlantic. The reason for this is that the original season premiere "Prairie Gothic" was a special feature length episode that ran for 1 hour 20 minutes. Amazon split this episode into two parts of just under 45 minutes, the first part retaining the title and number of the original episode and the second part becoming a new episode titled "Something Wicked This Way Comes" and numbered as episode two. The remaining episodes were numbered 3-10 which means that they don't match the original episode numbers.
This episode list reflects the original Sky Atlantic episode list.

Series 3 (2020)
Titled "Tin Star: Liverpool", the action moved to Liverpool.
Aired two episodes per week on Sky Atlantic.

Production
Filming took place in Alberta from June to December 2016, with scenes mainly shot in the town of High River, Alberta, located just south of Calgary.

Some of the towns in Alberta include Waterton and Dorothy.

References

External links

2017 British television series debuts
2020 British television series endings
2010s British drama television series
2010s British crime television series
2010s British mystery television series
2020s British drama television series
2020s British crime television series
2020s British mystery television series
British thriller television series
English-language television shows
Sky Atlantic original programming
Television series by Endemol
Television shows filmed in Alberta
Television shows set in Alberta
Television shows set in Liverpool
Television shows shot in Liverpool